Michael Owen Jackels (born April 13, 1954) is an American prelate of the Roman Catholic Church.  He has been serving as the archbishop of Archdiocese of Dubuque in Iowa since 2013. He previously served as the bishop of the Diocese of Wichita in Kansas, replacing Bishop Thomas J. Olmsted. Jackels was consecrated bishop at the Church of the Magdalen in Wichita on April 4, 2005.

Early life and education
Michael Jackels was born in Rapid City, South Dakota, on April 13, 1954.  A child of a military family, he lived in Wyoming, Spain and California before finally settling in Nebraska. to complete his secondary studies. Jackel says that as a young man, he became a Buddhist.  However, after reading a Bible from a Protestant co-worker at a country club, he decided to return to Catholicism.

Jackels attended the University of Nebraska-Lincoln, then entered St. Pius X Seminary in Kentucky in 1975.  He earned his Bachelor of Philosophy degree from St. Pius X in 1977. In 1981, Jackels completed his Master of Theology degree at Mt. Saint Mary's Seminary in Emmitsburg, Maryland.

Priesthood
Jackels was ordained a priest for the Diocese of Lincoln by Bishop Glennon Flavin on May 30, 1981. His first assignment was as the associate pastor of the Cathedral of the Risen Christ Parish and as a teacher at Pius X High School in Lincoln. From 1982 to 1985, Jackels was assigned as associate pastor of St. Thomas Aquinas Parish on the campus of the University of Nebraska in Lincoln. In addition to his teaching duties at Pius X High School, he also served as the assistant vocations director for the diocese during this period. In 1985, Jackels embarked on doctoral studies at the Pontifical University of St. Thomas Aquinas in Rome, earning his Doctor of Sacred Theology degree in 1989. His dissertation was a study of Catherine of Siena.

After returning to Lincoln, Jackels served for the next eight years served as the diocesan director of religious education, the master of ceremonies, the co-vicar for religious, and the chaplain for the School Sisters of Christ the King community in Lincoln. In 1994, Pope John Paul II named Jackels a prelate of honor, allowing him title of monsignor. Jackels returned to Rome in 1997 to work for the Congregation for the Doctrine of the Faith under then Cardinal Joseph Ratzinger, the future Pope Benedict XVI.

Episcopacy
John Paul II appointed Jackels as bishop of the Diocese of Wichita in January, 2005. On April 4, 2005, Jackels was consecrated by Archbishop Joseph Naumann. Bishops Fabian Bruskewitz and Thomas J. Olmsted served as co-consecrators.  Because of the size of the crowd in attendance and the small size of the Cathedral of the Immaculate Conception, Jackels' consecration took place at the larger Church of the Magdalen.

Bishop of Wichita

Jackels joined the other three Kansas bishops in approving a pastoral letter opposing embryonic stem cell research. He has spoken against same-sex marriage and abortion rights for women as well. He also opposes the death penalty and has written in the diocesan newspaper, Advance, in favor of what he views as more just immigration laws. Jackels also voted to approve language changes in the mass to bring the English translation into a better accord with the original Latin at the June 2006 meetings of the USCCB in Los Angeles. 

In areas outside of doctrine, he is active in promoting Catholic education, and helped to establish the Drexel Fund, which aids financially strapped Catholic schools within the diocese. The diocese had 48 seminarians, at the time one of the highest numbers of seminarians per capita of diocesan Catholics in the United States. 

On May 30, 2008, Jackels served as a co-consecrator to Auxiliary Bishop James D. Conley, a priest from the Diocese of Wichita, prior to his appointment as bishop. Jackels participates in the annual March for Life in Washington, D.C.

Archbishop of Dubuque
On April 8, 2013, Pope Francis appointed Jackels as archbishop of the Archdiocese of Dubuque.  He was installed by Archbishop Carlo Vigano, apostolic nuncio to the United States, on May 30, 2013, at the Church of the Nativity in Dubuque.

See also
 
 Catholic Church hierarchy
 Catholic Church in the United States
 Historical list of the Catholic bishops of the United States
 List of Catholic bishops of the United States
 Lists of patriarchs, archbishops, and bishops

References

External links
 Roman Catholic Archdiocese of Dubuque Official Site

Episcopal succession

1954 births
Living people
People from Rapid City, South Dakota
Roman Catholic Diocese of Lincoln
University of Nebraska alumni
Mount St. Mary's University alumni
Pontifical University of Saint Thomas Aquinas alumni
Roman Catholic bishops of Wichita
Roman Catholic archbishops of Dubuque
Religious leaders from Nebraska
Catholics from South Dakota
Converts to Roman Catholicism from Buddhism
21st-century Roman Catholic archbishops in the United States